The following page lists all power stations in Bosnia-Herzegovina.

Hydroelectric

Coal

See also 

 List of power stations in Europe
 List of largest power stations in the world

Bosnia-Herzegovina

Power stations